Hydaticus luczonicus, is a species of predaceous diving beetle found in India, Indonesia, Philippines, Sri Lanka, Thailand and Vietnam.

Gallery

References

Dytiscidae
Insects of Sri Lanka
Insects described in 1838